WBC Neftohimik 2010  is the Bulgarian basketball club for women, founded in 1993 in the city Burgas in Bulgaria.

History
Origins of the club in 1993 when at WBC "Neftohimik" based basketball section specialized in female profile. For several seasons the club turns in leading the country.
The first success for the club were the bronze medals in season 1997-98 Next year comes the first trophy - the Cup of Bulgaria again and bronze medals in the championship.

Winners
Bulgarian Women's Basketball Championship:
  (5) : 2005, 2006, 2009, 2010 и 2011 г.

Bulgarian Women's Basketball Cup:
  (6) : 1999, 2004, 2005, 2006, 2008 и 2015 г.

South Conference FIBA Europa
 1/2 finals: 2005

External links
BFB
БBFB - Neftohimik 2010
Neftohimik 2010

Neftokhimik Burgas
Neftokhimik Burgas